Bakery Jatta (born 6 June 1998) is a Gambian professional footballer who plays as a midfielder for 2. Bundesliga club Hamburger SV.

International career
Jatta was called up by Gambia national team in October 2019. He pulled out of the squad in November 2019, saying he wished to concentrate on his club career.

Personal life and identity dispute
Jatta is said to have come to Germany in 2015 as a refugee. However, in August 2019, suspicions in the news arose over his identity as according to a German press article by Sport Bild his real name was speculated to be Bakery Daffeh and his age was speculated to be older. Initially, neither the Federal Office for Migration and Refugees nor the local Hamburg authorities were able to confirm nor deny Jatta's identity. Subsequent news stories, however, have cast doubts on the Sport Bild report. The Hamburger Abendblatt, on 29 August, reports on a visit from a Bild reporter in Gambia who as it appears may have pretended to be a representative of the German Football Association (DFB) to obtain information in Gambia. According to the same Hamburger Abendblatt report, a witness previously named by the Bild and Sport Bild strongly disagrees that Jatta and Daffeh could be the same person, thus refuting those press claims

On 30 August, German media announced that Hamburger SV has been able to obtain his birth certificate, in addition to Bakery Jatta's passport, and along with it an affidavit by a clerk of the Ministry of Foreign Affairs of The Gambia. The responsible Hamburg authority then declared on 2 September that they approved the documents Jatta presented to them and that there was no evidence for further investigation. Following this case-closing statement, defeated 1. FC Nürnberg, VFL Bochum and KSC Karlsruhe withdrew their objection against the matches that Jatta played in.

On 19 September 2019, it was reported by Bild/Sport Bild, that Jatta had stated an e-mail address containing the name Bakary Daffeh to the Bremen authorities in 2015. The Sozialzentrum Gröpelingen/Walle (local social authority) submitted a copy of a personal questionnaire filled in by Jatta to the Bremen police, with the remark that there are great inconsistencies. Questioned by NDR public broadcaster, the Bremen prosecutor confirmed an examination of this facts. A few weeks later the prosecutor announced that there would be no further proceedings; the case was to be closed from their perspective. Also in October 2019, the CEO of Axel Springer SE (Bild/Sport Bild) publishing house, Mathias Döpfner, criticised the long duration of the investigation, and that most of the media would be "systematically" ignoring the case. He mentioned the Jatta case as an example why hatred grew in parts of the population. Subsequently, the connection of the case to the Halle synagogue shooting that he made was subject to criticism.

In the first days of July 2020 Jatta's Hamburg home was searched by the police under the suspicion of violation of the German residence act, because he is suspected of having made false claims regarding his identity. According to the Hamburg prosecutor, the investigations had shown that Jatta had maintained contact with persons connected to Daffeh. His cell phone and other devices were seized.

In March 2022, the court in Hamburg-Altona dismissed the case.

Career statistics

Club

References

External links
 

1998 births
Living people
Association football midfielders
Gambian footballers
Gambian expatriate footballers
Gambian expatriate sportspeople in Germany
Gambian emigrants to Germany
Expatriate footballers in Germany
Hamburger SV players
Hamburger SV II players
Regionalliga players
Bundesliga players
2. Bundesliga players
Age controversies